White Memorial Fountain, also known as The Claw, is a fountain by Aristides Demetrios on the Stanford University campus in Stanford, California, United States. It was installed in 1964, and Demetrios returned to restore the fountain in 2011. It has 65 jets.

The fountain was commissioned by Mr. and Mrs. Raymond B. White to commemorate their sons, William N. and John B. White II.

See also

 1964 in art

References

External links
 The Claw In Perspective (with photo), The Stanford Daily, January 23 2012.
 

1964 establishments in California
1964 sculptures
Fountains in California
Outdoor sculptures in California
Stanford University buildings and structures